Hymenocarpos is a genus of flowering plants in the legume family, Fabaceae. It belongs to the subfamily Faboideae. It may be synonymous with the genus Anthyllis.

Loteae
Fabaceae genera